The 1974 Berlin Marathon, known as the Berlin Volksmarathon, was the first running of the annual marathon race held in Berlin, West Germany, held on 13 October. Two West Germans won the competitions, with Günter Hallas taking the men's race in 2:44:53 hours and Jutta von Haase finishing first among women with 3:22:01. A total of 244 runners finished the race, comprising 234 men and 10 women.

Results

Men

Women

References 

 Results. Association of Road Racing Statisticians. Retrieved 2020-06-24.
 Berlin Marathon results archive. Berlin Marathon. Retrieved 2020-06-24.

External links 
 Official website

1974
Berlin Marathon
1970s in West Berlin
Berlin Marathon
Berlin Marathon